Valentin Olegovich Parinov (born 16 June 1959) is a retired Russian swimmer who won a silver medal in the 1500 m freestyle at the 1977 European Aquatics Championships, behind Vladimir Salnikov. He also competed in the same event at the 1976 Summer Olympics but did not reach the finals.

In 1973, aged 14, Parinov won two gold medals in the 400 m and 1500 m freestyle at Junior European Championships. The same year he set European and National records in the 800 m and 1500 m events among seniors.

References

1959 births
People from Primorsky Krai
Living people
Swimmers at the 1976 Summer Olympics
Russian male freestyle swimmers
Soviet male swimmers
Olympic swimmers of the Soviet Union
European Aquatics Championships medalists in swimming
Sportspeople from Primorsky Krai